David Fatialofa is a New Zealand rugby league player who played professionally in England for Whitehaven.

Playing career
Fatialofa was an Auckland Warriors junior and played in the 1995 Lion Red Cup final. He also represented the Junior Kiwis in 1992 and 1993 and played in France during the 1995/96 season.

He then moved to England, joining the Whitehaven under New Zealand coach Stan Martin.

He was named in the 2000 World Cup train on squad for Samoa but did not make the final squad.

In 2005 Fatialofa won the club's Player of Year award.

He retired at the end of the 2008 season.

He returned in 2010 to play for Whitehaven in a testimonial match for Neil Frazer.

References

Living people
New Zealand rugby league players
Whitehaven R.L.F.C. players
New Zealand sportspeople of Samoan descent
Junior Kiwis players
Rugby league props
Year of birth missing (living people)